P. Bhanumathi (1925–2005) was an actress in Telugu and Tamil cinema. She appeared in over 100 films. The following is a complete list of her films as an actress:

Filmography

As an actress

Playback singer
Bhanumathi gave her voice for herself and many actors to sing many songs.

Producer

Music director

References

External links 
 

Actress filmographies
Indian filmographies